7/1 may refer to:
July 1 (month-day date notation)
January 7 (day-month date notation)
 A form of septuple meter
 The margin at Brazil v Germany (2014 FIFA World Cup)

See also
 1/7 (disambiguation)
 Matthew 7:1